Dagon Township is located immediately north of downtown Yangon. The township comprises five wards, and shares borders with Bahan Township in the north, Ahlon Township in the west, Mingala Taungnyunt Township in the east, and Lanmadaw Township, Latha Township and Pabedan Township in the south.

Dagon is home to some of the most prominent places of the city, including the great Shwedagon Pagoda, the Maha Wizaya Pagoda, the National Museum, the National Theatre and the Yangon Region Hluttaw (Parliament). This prosperous neighborhood has many hotels, embassies and diplomatic residences. The township's Dagon 1 High School and Dagon 2 High School are considered among the top public high schools in the country.

On 6 February 2011, the Taw Win Centre, a major shopping and residential complex, was opened in the township. Construction on the 25-story complex began in 2004, but was stopped during the country's banking crisis, before resuming in March 2008. The country's first 3D movie theater opened at the Taw Win Centre on 1 March 2012. In June 2011, the Sitagu Sayadaw opened the Yangon campus of the Sitagu International Buddhist Academy in Dagon Township.

History
Dagon was a small fishing village founded by the Mon in the 6th century, CE, around the Shwedagon Pagoda. Throughout much of the history, the village was just in the periphery of Thanlyin (Syriam), the commercial city located across the Yangon river. Still, because of the pagoda, Dagon's cultural significance was far greater than its size. In 1755, King Alaungpaya captured the village, renamed it Yangon (most commonly translated as "End of Strife"), and founded a larger city by adding settlements such as Ahlon, Pabedan, Kyauktada, and Botataung.

During the British colonial period, Dagon was mostly a prosperous neighborhood, though the areas closer to downtown were full of squatters. Dagon boasted both the Methodist English High School, one of the top English-language medium schools and the nationalist Burmese language medium high school, Myoma High School.

In the 1950s, the Burmese government cleared the squatters in the southern part of the township, and built the Minmanaing Housing Project for senior civil servants. Dagon gained another prominent pagoda in the 1980s, when Gen. Ne Win commissioned the Maha Wizaya Pagoda. Dagon Town was designated a township in 1971.

Demographics

2014

The 2014 Myanmar Census reported that Dagon Township had a population of 25,082. The population density was 5,370.8 people per km2. The census reported that the median age was 30.4 years, and a sex ratio of 90 males per 100 females. There were 4,608 households; the median household size was 4.4.

Landmarks
The following landmarks in Dagon township are protected by the city.

References

Townships of Yangon
Populated places established in the 6th century